Atherix is a genus of 'ibis flies' belonging to the family Athericidae, a small family very similar to the Rhagionidae (snipe flies). Species within this genus are present in most of Europe and also in the Nearctic realm.

Species
Atherix alagezica Paramonov, 1926
Atherix amicorum (Thomas, 1985)
Atherix apfelbecki Strobl, 1902
Atherix aurichalcea Becker, 1921
Atherix basilica Nagatomi, 1958
Atherix chrysopiliformis Lindner, 1924
Atherix dalmatica (Szilády, 1934)
Atherix dispar Bezzi, 1909
Atherix erythraspis Bezzi, 1909
Atherix flavipes (Fabricius, 1781)
Atherix ibis (Fabricius, 1798)
Atherix ignota Szilády, 1934
Atherix lantha Webb, 1977
Atherix lugubris Macquart, 1834
Atherix marginata (Fabricius, 1781)
Atherix maroccana Séguy, 1930
Atherix neotropica Lindner, 1924
Atherix nicolae Thomas, 1993
Atherix pachypus Bigot, 1887
Atherix picta Loew, 1869
Atherix vaillanti (Thomas, 1982)
Atherix variegata Walker, 1848
Atherix vicina Szilády, 1943

References

Athericidae
Brachycera genera
Taxa named by Johann Wilhelm Meigen
Diptera of South America
Diptera of North America
Diptera of Australasia
Diptera of Asia
Diptera of Europe